Brigitte Bailer-Galanda (born 5 March 1952, Vienna) is an Austrian social scientist and historian. Bailer-Galanda is an honorary professor of contemporary history at the University of Vienna.

Early life
Brigitte Bailer-Galanda was born on 5 March 1952 in Vienna, Austria.

Education
She graduated four years later. From 1990 to 1992, she underwent doctoral studies under Erika Weinzierl's direction at the University of Vienna.

Career
Bailer-Galanda became an assistant researcher at the Documentation Centre of Austrian Resistance in 1979. In 1994, she was made a lecturer at the Department of Political Science at the University of Vienna. There she completed a habilitation in 2003 with the thesis The Origin of Restitution Laws (Die Entstehung der Rückstellungsgesetze), for which she was named an honorary professor of contemporary history.

Awards
 1992: Käthe Leichter Prize for the study of women's history in Austria
 1996:  for antifascist journalism in Austria
 1999:  from the 
 2013: Decoration of Honour for Services to the Republic of Austria (speech by )
 2015: Marietta and Friedrich Torberg Medal from the Israelitische Kultusgemeinde Wien

Citations

Living people
Writers from Vienna
1952 births
Contemporary historians
Historians of Nazism
Austrian women social scientists
Academics and writers on far-right extremism
University of Vienna alumni
Recipients of the Grand Decoration for Services to the Republic of Austria
Marietta and Friedrich Torberg Medal recipients
Academic staff of the University of Vienna
Women political scientists